Eduardo César Daud Gaspar (born 16 May 1978), known as Edu, is a Brazilian former professional footballer who is the sporting director of Premier League club Arsenal. As a player, he was an attacking and central midfielder, and played for Corinthians in Brazil, Arsenal in England, and Valencia in Spain across a twelve-year career.

Edu played for the Brazil national team from 2004 to 2005, making fifteen appearances.

Club career

Early career
Edu started his career in Série A with Corinthians. While with Corinthians, Edu won the 1998 and 1999 Brasileiro championships, and the 2000 FIFA Club World Championship.

Arsenal
After initially planning to join Arsenal in 2000, his transfer was put on hold after it was realised that he was in possession of a fake Portuguese passport. Months later, after qualifying for a European Union (EU) passport (aided by Italian lineage on his father's side), he signed for Arsenal on 16 January 2001 for £6 million. He had a turbulent time early on as his sister was killed in a car accident.

His Arsenal debut came in 2001 in a goalless draw tarnished by an injury after 15 minutes against Leicester City. He had replaced Freddie Ljungberg at half time only to be replaced by Dennis Bergkamp minutes later. It was an unfortunate start and he only managed to play in four more matches for the club during that season, one of which was a 0–3 defeat at home to Middlesbrough in which he contributed an own goal. His first goal for the club came against Grimsby in the League Cup on 27 November 2001. He went on to make a substitute appearance in the 2002 FA Cup Final as Arsenal emerged victorious. He also contributed 14 league appearances, and a goal against Aston Villa, as Arsenal won the 2001–02 Premier League, with Edu becoming the first Brazilian to win the Premier League.

In 2002–03 Edu made 18 appearances in the Premier League and featured heavily as Arsenal got to the FA Cup final for the third year running. Edu scored in Arsenal's fifth round win against Manchester United at Old Trafford, however injury issues in the latter part of the season meant he was left out of the squad for the final.

2003–04 season in midfield for Arsenal was seen as his finest season so far in football, he was part of the team which went 49 games unbeaten, (the whole 2003–04 Premier League season without defeat). He appeared in 30 League games and scored 2 goals, both against Chelsea, he scored the fourth of Arsenal's 5 in a 5–1 historic win against Inter Milan in the UEFA Champions League in November 2003, he made a career high 48 appearances and 7 goals for Arsenal in all competitions. Edu was on the pitch as Arsenal clinched the 2003–04 Premier League title at White Hart Lane on 25 April 2004. During the season, he made his 100th appearance for Arsenal.

Edu enjoyed mixed fortunes in the 2004–05 season. He missed the start of the season because he was away with Brazil at the Copa América. This was followed by speculation over his future at the club as he was in the last year of his contract with Arsenal. Talks with Valencia of Spain in January 2005 failed as the Mestalla outfit were not able to pay the fee Arsenal demanded.

Edu only scored two goals for Arsenal in 2004–05 – one was a fine chip in the 2–0 away win at West Bromwich Albion in May 2005, and the other a penalty kick in a 7–0 win over Everton in 2005. He did however come on as an extra time substitute as Arsenal won the 2005 FA Cup Final.

Valencia
In May 2005, it was confirmed that he would leave Arsenal in the summer on a Bosman ruling free transfer. Valencia, Juventus, Inter Milan, and Barcelona were hot favourites to secure the signature of Edu, and on 30 May, Valencia announced it had signed him to a five-year deal. Shortly after signing, Edu suffered a pre-season injury that ruled him out of first-team action until 4 April 2006, when he made his debut in the 5–3 victory over Cádiz. On 3 July 2009, the Brazilian midfielder left Valencia through contractual termination.

Corinthians
After being released in Spain, Edu signed a contract with his former club Corinthians on 6 August 2009, which was to last until 31 December 2011. After playing four matches during the 2010 season, his contract was terminated by mutual consent, and Edu announced his retirement from professional football.

International career
Edu initially considered playing for the England national team upon gaining a British passport as he did not think he would be picked for Brazil. He finally got a call-up to the Brazil national team in 2004 and made his debut on 28 April 2004 in a friendly match against Hungary. He played for them in the 2004 Copa América and 2005 FIFA Confederations Cup, which were both won by Brazil. In the final of the Copa América 2004 he scored one of the penalties in the shootout as Brazil defeated Argentina.

Post-playing career
On 17 March 2011, Corinthians announced that Edu would take over from William Machado as the club's director of football. He also assisted Carlos Queiroz's Iranian national team during the 2014 FIFA World Cup. From 2016 to 2019, he was the general coordinator of the Brazil national team.

On 9 July 2019, it was announced that Edu had become Arsenal's first-ever technical director. The club's director of football, Raul Sanllehi said: "We're very excited that Edu is joining the team. He has great experience and technical football knowledge and most importantly is a true Arsenal man. He understands the club and what we stand for to our millions of fans around the world." On 18 November 2022, Edu was appointed as Arsenal's first-ever sporting director.

Media
Edu was involved in the Amazon Original sports docuseries All or Nothing: Arsenal, which documented the club by spending time with the coaching staff and players behind the scenes both on and off the field throughout their 2021–22 season. He was also involved in All or Nothing: Brazil National Team.

Honours
Corinthians
Campeonato Brasileiro Série A: 1998, 1999
FIFA Club World Championship: 2000

Arsenal
Premier League: 2001–02, 2003–04
FA Cup: 2001–02, 2004–05
FA Community Shield: 2002

Valencia
Copa del Rey: 2007–08

Brazil
Copa América: 2004
FIFA Confederations Cup: 2005

Individual
Premier League Player of the Month: February 2004

References

External links

1978 births
Living people
Footballers from São Paulo
Brazilian footballers
Brazil international footballers
Association football midfielders
Sport Club Corinthians Paulista players
Arsenal F.C. players
Valencia CF players
Campeonato Brasileiro Série A players
Premier League players
La Liga players
2004 Copa América players
2005 FIFA Confederations Cup players
Copa América-winning players
FIFA Confederations Cup-winning players
Brazilian expatriate footballers
Expatriate footballers in England
Expatriate footballers in Spain
Brazilian expatriate sportspeople in England
Brazilian expatriate sportspeople in Spain
Arsenal F.C. non-playing staff
FA Cup Final players